Calliostoma eminens is a species of sea snail, a marine gastropod mollusk in the family Calliostomatidae.

Description
The size of the shell varies between 43 mm and 52 mm.

Distribution
This marine species occurs off the Antipodes Island, New Zealand.

References

 Marshall, 1995. A revision of the recent Calliostoma species of New Zealand (Mollusca:Gastropoda:Trochoidea). The Nautilus 108(4):83-127

External links
 

eminens
Gastropods described in 1995